Galli were priests of the Phrygian goddess Cybele.

Galli may also refer to:

Botany
 Crista-galli (disambiguation)
 Erythrina crista-galli, a flowering tree sometimes called cockspur coral tree
 Echinochloa crus-galli, a type of wild grass commonly known as cockspur (or cockspur grass), common barnyard grass, or simply barnyard grass
 Polylepis crista-galli, a species of plant in the family Rosaceae
 Crataegus crus-galli, a species of hawthorn

People
 Gauls (Latin: Galli), the ancient people perceived by the Greeks and Romans as culturally or linguistically Celtic

Arts
 Galli da Bibiena family, a family of Italian artists of the 17th and 18th centuries, especially:
 Ferdinando Galli-Bibiena or Ferdinando Galli Bibiena (1656–1743), also known as Ferdinando Galli da Bibiena or Bibbiena, Italian architect, designer, and painter
 Amelita Galli-Curci (1882–1963), Italian opera singer
 Caterina Galli, (ca. 1723–1804), Italian opera singer
 Célestine Galli-Marié (1840–1905), French singer
 Daniela Galli (born 1972), Italian singer-songwriter known as Dhany
 Federica Galli (1932–2009), Italian artist
 Filippo Galli (bass) (1783–1853), Italian opera singer
 Ida Galli (born 1942), Italian film actress
 Lina Galli (1899–1993), Italian writer
 Malu Galli (born 1971), Brazilian actress, playwright and stage director
 María Galli (1872–1960), Swiss-Uruguayan pianist, composer and music teacher
 Rosalinda Galli (born 1949), Italian voice actress
 Ruggero Galli, Italian opera singer active in the 19th and 20th century

Sports
 Agustín Galli (born 2004), Argentine footballer
 B. J. Gallis (born 1975), Canadian football player
 Filippo Galli, (born 1963), Italian football player
 Francesca Galli (born 1960), Italian racing cyclist
 Carlo Galli (footballer) (1931–2022), Italian footballer
 Ernesto Galli (1945–2020), Italian professional football player and coach
 Giovanni Galli (born 1958), Italian football player and politician
 Gigi Galli or Gianluigi Galli (born 1973), Italian rally driver
 Lorenzo Galli (born 1979), retired Italian alpine skier
 Nanni Galli (1940–2019),  Italian sports-car racer
 Jessica Galli (born 1983), American wheelchair athlete
 Leonardo Galli (born 1997), Italian professional footballer
 Niccolò Galli (footballer, born 1983) (1983–2001),  Italian footballer
 Nikos Galis (born 1957), Greek professional basketball player
 Remo Galli (born 1912), Italian professional football player and coach.
 Sandro Galli (born 1987), Swiss footballer

Science and technology
 Franz San Galli, Russian: Франц Карлович Сан Галли, Franz Karlovich San Galli (1824–1908), Russian businessman who invented the radiator
 Giuseppe Galli (1933-2016), Italian Gestalt psychologist
 Nadiashda Galli-Shohat (died 1948), Russian physicist
 Ricardo Galli or Ricardo Adolfo Galli Granada, computer scientist
 Stephen J. Galli (born 1947), American pathologist

Other people
 Adam Blue Galli, armed robber arrested in 1992
 G. Fred Galli (1902–1967), American cheesemaker and legislator
 Giorgio Galli (historian) (1928–2020), Italian political scientist, historian, and academic
 Philippe Galli (born 1956), French prefect

Other uses
 The Funeral of the Anarchist Galli (Italian, Il Funerale dell’anarchico Galli), a 1911 painting by Italian painter Carlo Carrà of Angelo Galli (died 1904)

See also

 
 
 Crista galli, a bone
 Galli–Galli disease
 Galli-Curci Theatre
 Ascaridia galli (A. galli), a parasitic roundworm
 Galli Galli Sim Sim, the Hindi language adaptation of the children's television program Sesame Street
 Li Galli (the Gallos), an archipelago of islands off the Amalfi Coast, Italy
 Pieter Gallis (1633–1697), a Dutch Golden Age painter
 Gala, priests of the goddess Inanna
 Galle (disambiguation)
 Galley (disambiguation)
 Gallus (disambiguation)
 Gally (disambiguation)

Italian-language surnames